Marcellus and Apuleius were third- or fourth-century martyrs who were inserted in the General Roman Calendar in the 13th century. They were recognized as saints by the Catholic Church, with 7 October as their feast day.
Apuleius is considered purely legendary, and is no longer recognized.

Recognition

Marcellus was associated with a Saint Apuleius, which led to them being mentioned together in some editions of the Roman Martyrology. In the Tridentine Calendar, Marcellus was commemorated with Apuleius and two other saints on 7 October, the feast day of Pope Mark. The Sacramentarium of Pope Gelasius assigned a mass to them. In 1716, this day became the feast of Our Lady of the Rosary, and the commemoration of Marcellus and Apuleius was moved to 8 October. 

Marcellus were restored to 7 October in 1969 and Apuleius was expunged from the official list of saints of the Catholic Church, as without historical foundation.
Although the veneration of the two saints is very old, their existing Acts are not genuine and agree to a great extent with those of Saints Nereus and Achilleus.

Monks of Ramsgate account

The monks of St Augustine's Abbey, Ramsgate wrote in their Book of Saints (1921),

Butler's account

The hagiographer Alban Butler (1710–1773) wrote in his Lives of the Fathers, Martyrs, and Other Principal Saints under October 7,

References

Sources

 

 

4th-century Christian martyrs
4th-century Romans
Year of birth unknown